Tauno Ilmoniemi (ne Granit) (16 May 1893 – 21 September 1934) was a Finnish gymnast and diver who competed in the 1912 Summer Olympics. He was born in Kuopion maalaiskunta, Northern Savonia and died in Oulu.

Ilmoniemi was part of the Finnish team, which won the silver medal in the gymnastics men's team, free system event.

He also competed in the plain high diving event, but he was eliminated first round.

References

External links
profile

1893 births
1934 deaths
Finnish male artistic gymnasts
Finnish male divers
Olympic gymnasts of Finland
Olympic divers of Finland
Gymnasts at the 1912 Summer Olympics
Divers at the 1912 Summer Olympics
Olympic silver medalists for Finland
Olympic medalists in gymnastics
Medalists at the 1912 Summer Olympics
Sportspeople from North Savo